Attercliffe Victory F.C. was an English association football club from Sheffield, South Yorkshire. The club competed in the FA Amateur Cup in 1926, a season after winning the Sheffield Amateur League

References

Defunct football clubs in England
Defunct football clubs in South Yorkshire
Sheffield Amateur League